Joe Wark (9 October 1947 – 1 October 2015) was a Scottish professional footballer who spent his entire professional career with Motherwell, making 464 appearances in the Scottish Football League.

In later life, Wark was diagnosed with dementia and took part in the Remember Well project, run by North Lanarkshire Council, Motherwell FC, NHS Lanarkshire and Alzheimer's Scotland. Wark died on 1 October 2015.

On 23 September 2021, it was announced that Wark was to be inducted into the Motherwell F.C. Hall of Fame.

References

1947 births
2015 deaths
Scottish footballers
Irvine Victoria F.C. players
Motherwell F.C. players
Scottish Football League players
Footballers from Glasgow
Association football fullbacks
Scottish Football League representative players
Scottish Junior Football Association players